Pure Shit (censored as Pure S) is a 1975 Australian drama film directed by Bert Deling.

When the film premiered at Melbourne’s Playbox in May 1976, the Vice Squad raided the theatre. It was initially banned, then given an R certificate, and the title was changed from Pure Shit to Pure S.

The low-budget film provoked a hostile reaction from the mainstream media on its initial release. It is now considered an "underground" classic.

Plot summary
A young woman dies of a heroin overdose. Four junkies who knew her commandeer her car and spend 24 hours searching the streets of Melbourne for good quality heroin, and excitement.

Cast
Gary Waddell as Lou
Ann Hetherington as Sandy
Carol Porter as Gerry
John Laurie as John
Max Gillies as Dr Wolf
Tim Robertson as TV interviewer
Helen Garner as Jo
Phil Motherwell
Russell Kirby as Shoplifter / TV Interviewee 
Greig Pickhaver as Record shop worker
Vicki Heal as Girl on Phone

Production
The film's budget was partly provided by the Film, Radio and Television Board of the Australia Council and partly by the Buoyancy Foundation, an organisation to help drug takers. Bert Deling says he was particularly influenced by Jean Renoir and Howard Hawks.

Lead actor Garry Waddell says he helped with the script:
It was really good having Bert there because he helped me a lot. If you weren't sure of anything you could always get reassurance from him or the cameraman, Tom Cowan. It wasn't a hard movie to work on because it was so enjoyable. The relationships between people on the film were always good.

Writer Helen Garner has a small role as a speed-addled woman named Jo. Garner starred in the film shortly before she published Monkey Grip (1977), which is set in a similar milieu of communal drug use.

Release
The Commonwealth film censors initially banned the movie but allowed it to be released with an "R" rating provided the title was changed from Pure Shit to Pure S. Deling later said that the film "played two weeks at Melbourne’s Playbox and had a short Sydney run … but very few people got to see it, and we didn’t make a cent from it." The movie was polarising, with the critic of the Herald calling it "the most evil film that I've ever seen" but others such as Bob Ellis championing it.

The film was released on DVD in 2009.

Accolades

See also
Cinema of Australia

References

External links

Pure Shit at the Australian screen
Pure S at Oz Movies
Anne Hetherington -image of Anne Hetherington at 78 Curtain St, North Carlton

1975 films
Australian drama films
Films set in Melbourne
Films shot in Melbourne
Films about heroin addiction
1975 drama films
1970s English-language films
Films directed by Bert Deling